Dille-Probst House, also known as the Colonel Otto Probst House, is a historic home located at South Bend, St. Joseph County, Indiana. It was built in 1888, and is a -story, "T"-plan, Queen Anne style frame dwelling with a brick veneer.  It has a steeply pitched hipped roof and features a polygonal tower and Eastlake movement style front porch.

It was listed on the National Register of Historic Places in 1994.

References

Houses on the National Register of Historic Places in Indiana
Queen Anne architecture in Indiana
Houses completed in 1888
Buildings and structures in South Bend, Indiana
Houses in St. Joseph County, Indiana
National Register of Historic Places in St. Joseph County, Indiana